Keladi Kanmani is a 2015 Indian Tamil-language soap opera starring Arnav, Divya Sridhar, Krithika Krishnan, Shefaali Shamili,  Sadhana and others. It aired on Sun TV from 6 April 2015 to 7 October 2017 for 767 episodes. The series was produced by Cine Times Entertainment and Season 1 story directed by O. N. Rathnam. Later season 2 was directed by P.selvam.
The show started to re-telecast on Star Vijay from 9 January 2023 Monday to Saturday 12:30PM–1:00PM

Plot

Season 1
Bhavani has a mentally challenged daughter, Maya. Bavani's husband Nandakumar divorces her and marries another woman. Bhavani raises Maya alone with much difficulty. One day when Bhavani cannot solve all her problems, she commits suicide. To save her, Yugendran (also known as Yugi) comes and marries Maya. Yugi's mother does not accept Maya as her daughter-in-law as Maya is mentally challenged. Despite the rocky relationship and the problems between Yugi and Maya, their love was always unconditional. One day, the priest tells Bhavani, she will need to visit a holy place to do some prayers to make her daughter become a normal women. Bhavani would bring Maya to that place and do all the prayers.

The season comes to an end when Maya's mother sacrifices her life to god to make Maya a normal woman. When Maya wakes up, her mother will die. Maya will know nothing of her previous life when she awakens. She will be brought to the temple's leader Chidambaram's house and he will adopt her as his daughter. In there, she is renamed to Mahalakshmi and season 2 will begin.

Season 2
A non-married girl Mahalakshmi is asked to walk around the village naked to fulfill the god's wishes. To save Maha from the embarrassment, Vijayan comes to the temple and marry Maha. Maha is now married and can no longer do the vows. Vijay's family has a curse from the snake. Whoever tries to marry Vijay or his sibling will die. But Maha is special, she has the power of the snake god. Vijay's father and older brother is unhappy about Vijay's decision on marrying the girl and will try to kill her. But, she escapes from their every attempts with help of Nagathamman. Meanwhile, Naagamanimaalai, an Icchadhari Snake enters into Vijay's family to take revenge. Here, now she reveals her past that She and her husband Aryan were Icchadhari Snakes and they were killed by Vijay's ancestor. Now, she comes again to take revenge on the family and wants to remarry her husband, as he is in form of Vijay at Present. Naagamanimaalai enters into Vijay's family as name of Nageshwari, who is Vijay's cousin. Later, Nagathamman, Snake goddess comes to Vijay's home to save that family from Nagamanimaalai. Finally, Naagathamman destroys Nageshwari's powers and turned her as a normal human being. Finally, She marries Jeyamani, Vijay's elder brother. Now, the new story line starts that Jeeva, who is exactly looks like Vijay. Jeeva is an IPS Officer of Narashingapuram, who wants to save the  people from the Sena's family in that Village. Unfortunately, he died already. So, Vijay turns himself as Jeeva and solve the remaining problems that happens in the Village. Finally, Sena is shot by the police and Vijay joins with Maha and his family.

Cast

Season 1: (Episodes 1–332)
 Krithika Krishnan as Maya Yugendran
 Sadhana as Bhavani: Maya's mother
 Arnav as Yugendran "Yugi"
 Puviarasu as Prakash, Maya's ex-love interest
 Sai Priyanka Ruth as Priyanka: Yugi's younger sister
 Shanthi Williams as Bhagyam: Yugi's mother
 Manikandan as Pratap: Priyanka's husband
 Jai Ram as Velu: Yugi's friend
 Preethi Kumar as Vaishali: Maya's step-sister
 M. Ramachanthiran as Nandakumar: Maya and Vaishu's father, Bhavani's ex-husband
 Sujatha Panju as Rekha: Nandu's second wife and Vaishu's mother
 Krithika as Malathi Pachai: Yugi's elder sister
 Sukkiran as Pachaimuthu: Malathi's husband and Yugi's brother-in-law
 Joker Thulasi as Ethiraj: Pachai's father
 Bharath Guru as Dilli: Pachai's brother
 Reena as Shantha "SK" Kumari
 Sathiyasai as Bhargavi, nicknamed Kuttyma: Yugi's youngest sister
 Renuka as Malar: Bhavani's housemaid)
 Jacob Kevins as Gautham: Kuttymah's boyfriend
 Krishna Kishore as Inbha: Pratap's elder brother
 Mahalakshmi VJ as Varsha: Pratap's elder sister
 Jegan

Season 2: (Episodes 333–767)

Main cast
 Divya Sridhar (Episodes 526-767) as Maya alias Mahalakshmi "Maha" Vijayan
 Krithika Krishnan (Episodes 1-333) as Maya (archival footage of season 1)
 Shefaali Shamili (Episodes 333-525) as Maya alias Mahalakshmi "Maha" Vijayan (Replaced by Divya Sridhar)
 Arnav as Vijayan "Vijay"/ Aryagan "Arya" (Icchadhari Snake) and Jeeva IPS. Yugi's medium

Recurring cast
 Feroz khan as Jayamani (Vijay's Eldest Brother)
 Nancy Jennifer as Naga Manimalai, Fake Nageshwari "Eshwari", an Icchadhari snake, later turns a human form
 Sheela as Muthupechi: Vijay's mother
 Vineetha Shalini as Shalu: Vijay's Youngest Sister
 B. Jayalakshmi as Ambika: Vijay's Eldest Sister
 Gracy as Eshwari: Maha's adoptive Sister
 Vittal Rao as Chidambaram: Maha's adoptive Father
 Azhagu as Thillainayagam: Vijay's father
 Divya Ganesh as Chembaruthi: Jeyamani's ex-wife
 Geetha Ravishankar as Chembaruthi's mother
 Gayathri as Jeeva's mother
 Thilla as Bairavan
 Shyamili as Jeeva's love interest
 Gopi as Paarthaa
 Pandiaraj as Sena

Original soundtrack

Title song
It was written by lyricist Yugabharathi, composed by the music director Kiran. It was sung by Chinmayi.

Soundtrack

See also
 List of programs broadcast by Sun TV

References

External links
 Official Website 

Sun TV original programming
Tamil-language thriller television series
Tamil-language fantasy television series
Tamil-language romance television series
2010s Tamil-language television series
2015 Tamil-language television series debuts
Tamil-language television shows
2017 Tamil-language television series endings